The men's 57 kg (125.4 lbs) Light-Contact category at the W.A.K.O. World Championships 2007 in Belgrade was the lightest of the male Light-Contact tournaments being the equivalent of the featherweight division when compared to Low-Kick and K-1's weight classes.  There were fourteen men from two continents (Europe and Asia) taking part in the competition.  Each of the matches was three rounds of two minutes each and were fought under Light-Contact rules. 

Due to the uneven number of fighters required for a tournament designed for sixteen, one of the contestants had a bye through to the quarter final stage.  The tournament winner was Hungary's Dezső Debreczeni who defeated Russia's Maxim Aysin in the final to claim the gold.  Turkey's Selcuk Laleci and Sweden's Thomas Karlsson claimed bronze medals for reaching the semi finals.

Results

Key

See also
List of WAKO Amateur World Championships
List of WAKO Amateur European Championships
List of male kickboxers

References

External links
 WAKO World Association of Kickboxing Organizations Official Site

Kickboxing events at the WAKO World Championships 2007 Belgrade
2007 in kickboxing
Kickboxing in Serbia